Chlordimeform is an acaricide (pesticide) active mainly against motile forms of mites and ticks and against eggs and early instars of some Lepidoptera insects.  After the International Agency for Research on Cancer reported sufficient evidence that its major metabolite, 4-chloro-o-toluidine, was a carcinogen, its use has ceased and its registration has been withdrawn in most countries.

References

Amidines
Organochloride insecticides
Benzene derivatives